New Islamic Civilization is a proposed concept for  establishing a new civilization, called the ultimate purpose of Iranian Government related with the Second Phase of the Revolution introduced by the Office of the Supreme Leader of Iran. Supreme Leader Ali Khamenei discussed it on several occasions including the Islamic Unity Conference.

Analysis 
Characteristics of New Islamic Civilization from the perspective of the Supreme Leader include

 The centrality of Quranic laws
 Collective wisdom
 Betterment of international relations

See also
Cultural engineering document

Further reading
Establishment of new civilization in 2nd phase of the Islamic Revolution (4)
ISLAMIC-IRANIAN CIVILIZATION: AN INSPIRATION FOR THE THIRD WAVE OF ISLAMIC AWAKENING
Dictators and civilizational thinking in Iran: From the Great Civilization to Islamic Civilization
</ref>

References

Government of Iran